Actuarial reinsurance premium calculation uses the similar mathematical tools as actuarial insurance premium. Nevertheless, Catastrophe modeling, Systematic risk or risk aggregation statistics tools are more important.

Burning cost 
Typically burning cost is the estimated cost of claims in the forthcoming insurance period, calculated from previous years' experience adjusted for changes in the numbers insured, the nature of cover and medical inflation.

 Historical (aggregate) data extraction
 Adjustments to obtain 'as if' data:
 present value adjustment using actuarial rate, prices index,...
 base insurance premium correction,
 underwriting policy evolution,
 clauses application 'as if' data, calcul of the 'as if' historical reinsurance indemnity,
 Reinsurance pure premium rate computing,
 add charges, taxes and reduction of treaty

"As if" data involves the recalculation of prior years of loss experience to demonstrate what the underwriting results of a particular program would have been if the proposed program had been in force during that period.

Probabilist methods

Premium formulation 
Let us note  the and    the deductible of XS or XL, with the limite  ( XS ).

The premium :

where

XS or XL premium formulation with Pareto 

If  and  :
$

if   and  il n'y a pas de solution.
  
If  and  :

  
If  and  :

XS premium using Lognormal cost distribution 

If  follows  then  follows 

Then:

With deductible and without limit :

Monte Carlo estimation

Vulnerability curve

Regression estimation 

This method uses data along the x-y axis to compute fitted values. It is actually based on the equation for a straight line, y=bx+a.(2)

Includes reinsurances specificities

Clauses

Long-Term Indemnity Claims 
Actuarial reserves modellisation.

See also
 
Reinsurance
Insurance
Actuarial Science
Ruin Theory

References 

	

2.  [2] http://www.r-tutor.com/elementary-statistics/simple-linear-regression/estimated-simple-regression-equation

Actuarial science